Richmondtown is a neighborhood in the Mid-Island section of Staten Island, New York City. It is bounded by Arthur Kill Road on the northwest, Richmond Road on the north, Amboy Road on the east and southeast, and the United Hebrew and Ocean View cemeteries on the southwest.

Name
Originally known as Coccles Town (sometimes misreckoned as Cuckolds Town) because of the abundance of oyster and clam shells found in the waters of the nearby Fresh Kills, Richmondtown gained its present name in 1728 when the village now preserved as Historic Richmond Town was founded. The village became the county seat of Richmond County (with which Staten Island is coterminous) and remained as such until the emergence of St. George soon after the ferries to Manhattan and Brooklyn began to proliferate at the latter site near the end of the 19th century.

Location
Located at the base of Lighthouse Hill with New Dorp and Oakwood to the east, Richmondtown has seen much new home construction since the mid-1960s, and ranks as one of the most popular destinations for families seeking to relocate to Staten Island from New York City's other boroughs, especially Brooklyn.

The town is also home to one of the ten remaining Volunteer Fire Departments in New York City Richmond Engine Company 1, which operates a 2005 American LaFrance Engine purchased through a federal home security grant.

The Church of St. Andrew and Voorlezer's House are listed on the National Register of Historic Places. St. Patrick's Church was declared a New York City Landmark in 1968.

Education

Library

The New York Public Library (NYPL) operates the Richmondtown branch at 200 Clarke Avenue at Amber Street. It opened in 1996 and contains two floors: a first floor for adults and a second floor for children. In recent years, the Richmondtown Library has been updated to include a TechConnect lab offering"more than 100 technology classes, both online and in-person, at libraries throughout the Bronx, Manhattan, and Staten Island" free of charge.

Schools
Richmondtown is zoned to one elementary school, PS 23 The Richmondtown School. It is also zoned to middle schools: IS 2 George L. Egbert and IS 24 Myra S. Barnes.

Transportation
Richmondtown is served by the  local buses and the  express bus.

Notable people
Richmondtown is the birthplace of American bare-knuckle boxer Bill Richmond (August 5, 1763 – December 28, 1829) who was born a slave. Richmond went to England in 1777 where he achieved fame and fortune and spent the remainder of his life.

References

Former county seats in New York (state)
Former villages in New York City
Neighborhoods in Staten Island